Karen Hampton may refer to:
 Karen Hampton (textile designer), American textile designer, lives in Indiana
 Karen Hampton (weaver) (born 1958), American weaver and textile designer, lives in California